Ni Bo (born 4 May 1989) is a Chinese footballer who currently plays for China League Two side Shenzhen Bogang.

Club career
Ni Bo started his football career by joining Wuhan Guanggu's youth academy and he was part of the squad that won national reserve league title in 2008. In January 2009, he moved to Chinese Super League side Guangzhou Pharmaceutical for trial after Wuhan was dissolved. Ni received high praise by then manager Shen Xiangfu and transferred to Guangzhou on a free transfer in February 2009. He was called up to the first team in the middle of 2009 league season, but didn't have a chance to appear in the league game. After Guangzhou relegated to the second tier in 2010, Ni made his senior debut on 1 May 2010 in a 1–0 home victory against Anhui Jiufang, coming on as a substitute for Hu Zhaojun in the second half. He was substituted on to play in the next two league matches. However, he suffered a knee ligament rupture after a few matches, ruling him out for four months. On 23 October 2010, after recovering from injury, Ni was subbed on from the bench in a 5–0 away victory against Nanjing Yoyo. His knee ligament injury relapsed in early 2011 and finally received surgery in April 2011, keeping him out of the field for the rest of the 2011 league season. On 10 July 2013, he scored his first and second goal for the club in a 2013 Chinese FA Cup match in which Guangzhou beat League Two club Dali Ruilong 7–1. In February 2014, Ni moved to China League One side Shenyang Zhongze on a one-year loan deal. He made his debut for the club on 16 March 2014 in a 1–0 win against Beijing Institute of Technology FC. Ni was released by Guangzhou Evergrande at the end of 2014 season.

In August 2016, Ni joined Hong Kong Premier League side R&F, which was the satellite team of Guangzhou R&F. He made his debut on 18 September 2016 in the 2016–17 Hong Kong Senior Challenge Shield against BC Glory Sky. Ni was sent off in R&F's 2–0 league loss to Wofoo Tai Po on 23 October 2016. He was later handed a three-match ban by Hong Kong Football Association after being found guilty of violent conduct.

On 21 January 2017, Ni transferred to his hometown club Wuhan Zall in the China League One.

Career statistics
As of 3 November 2018. 

1League Cups include Hong Kong Senior Challenge Shield, Hong Kong League Cup and Hong Kong Sapling Cup.

Honours

Club
Guangzhou Evergrande
Chinese Super League: 2011, 2012, 2013
China League One: 2010
Chinese FA Super Cup: 2012
Chinese FA Cup: 2012
AFC Champions League: 2013

Wuhan Zall
China League One: 2018

References

External links
Player profile at Sodasoccer.com
 

1989 births
Living people
Footballers from Wuhan
Association football forwards
Chinese footballers
Guangzhou F.C. players
R&F (Hong Kong) players
Wuhan F.C. players
Chinese Super League players
China League One players